The hwacha or hwach'a (literally "fire cart") was a multiple rocket launcher and an organ gun of similar design which were developed in fifteenth century Korea. The former variant fired one or two hundred rocket-powered arrows while the latter fired several dozen iron-headed arrows or bolts out of gun barrels. The term was used to refer to other war wagons or other cart-based artillery in later periods, such as that developed by Byeon Yijung in the 1590s.

These weapons were notably deployed in the defense of the Korean Peninsula against the invading Japanese when they invaded in the 1590s. Some East Asian historians believe this technological breakthrough, alongside the turtle ship in the mid-16th century, had a distinctive effect during the war.

Today, hwachas appear in Korean museums, national parks, and popular culture.

History

Early firearms 
Firearms were recognized by Goryeo military leaders as being of utmost importance in national defense. Constituting a particular threat were Japanese raiders who frequently plundered coastal towns in increasing numbers from 1350 onward. Gunpowder and firearms explicitly for combating them on the sea were imported from China in 1374 but the necessary expertise for production was still restricted by Chinese government policy.

Numerous ancient Chinese documents relating to gunpowder based weapons such as the Huolongjing were acquired by the Koreans in addition to small samples of Chinese gunpowder which the Koreans reverse engineered.

Local production did not begin until Choe Mu-seon, having acquired the methods for purifying potassium nitrate from visiting Chinese merchants, accomplished it between 1374 and 1376. A government office for the development of gunpowder and firearms was established in 1377 with Choe appointed its head. A number of weapons were developed here, including hand-cannon and a series of rockets, in particular the juhwa.

Hwacha 
The hwacha further developed from the juhwa and the singijeon. The first hwacha was created in Korea in 1409 during the Joseon Dynasty by several Korean scientists, including Yi Do (이도, not to be mistaken for Sejong the Great, even though their names sound similar) and Choi Hae-san (최해산, son of Choe Museon). 
Stronger and more effective hwachas were made in 1451 under the decree of King Munjong, by the king himself and his younger brother Pe. Im-Yung (Yi Gu, 임영대군 이구). The Munjong Hwacha is a well-known type that nowadays could fire 100 rocket arrows or 200 small Chongtong bullets at one time with changeable modules. At the time, 50 units were deployed in Hanseong (present-day Seoul) and another 80 on the northern border. By the end of 1451, hundreds of hwachas were deployed throughout the peninsula. Another variant was the Mangam Hwacha. A boxed cart with large faces of a dokkaebi painted on all three sides. Armed with forty seungja-chongtongs with fourteen in the front and thirteen on the left and right sides, only two soldiers can manage it, one firing the rows and the other reloads. They can fire 600 bullets, with each barrel holding 15 shots each.

Imjin wars (1592–1598) 

Hwachas saw action most extensively against the Japanese during their invasions of Korea. The hwachas were mostly placed in fortresses or citadels, and used defensively. They proved to be powerful in many battles, and were most prominent in the Battle of Haengju, in which 3,400 Koreans repelled 30,000 Japanese with the help of 40 hwachas. The Japanese samurai infantry, especially in the Battle of Haengju, typically advanced in dense formations, presenting ideal targets for the hwacha.

Hwachas were also used on panokseons under the navy of Admiral Yi Sun-sin to attack Japanese ships from a distance.

Components 

The hwacha's structure was very similar to a handcart, with a mobile wooden launchpad on the top containing 100 to 200 cylindrical holes, into which igniters like those of the sajeonchongtong (사전총통) were placed.

The ammunition, similar to the ancient Chinese fire arrows, consisted of a 1.1 m long arrow with the addition of a gunpowder-filled paper tube attached to the shaft just below the head. Approximately 100 projectiles were loaded and launched in one volley, and had a range of up to 2000 m.

One variant had 5 rows of 10 gun barrels in the launchpad, each of which could fire a bundle of four arrow-like projectiles.

The back side of the hwacha featured two parallel arms that allowed the operator to push and pull the machine, and a vertical strip designed for in-line attacks or stand ground-sentry positions.

The wagon-like wheels were usually fastened by wood pivots and iron axles. In order to reduce friction between the wheels and the axles, tar oil was used.

Hwachas were usually made of pine wood, although there are some versions made of oak. The ropes used were usually made of hemp.

The Korean army included siege engineers and blacksmiths in order to make repairs to the hwacha in case of damage due to poor road conditions, bad weather, or battle.

Projectiles 

Unlike the cannons or mortars used in Western warfare during Middle Ages and the 16th century, which required heavy iron balls, hwachas fired arrows which were thin and light, making it an easy-to-maneuver siege weapon.

The holes in the hwacha's launching array ranged in diameter from 2.5 to 4 cm, which allowed thin Gungdo bow-like arrows to be fired and also admitted sajeonchongtong class igniters placed in the back side of the shooting board.

Singijeon-class projectiles were small arrows designed by Korean siege engineers specifically to be used in hwachas. Called so (소), or "small", they possessed a pouch of black powder attached in the bottom near to the fletching section. Besides the singijeon-class projectiles, hwacha could also fire 100 steel-tipped rockets.

Because of the large numbers of arrows fired from hwachas and the widespread damage of its attack, a dense formation presented an ideal target for hwachas.

Ballistics and range 

The trajectory of the so projectiles was fairly flat and – like other spinning projectiles – affected by the Magnus effect. Operators used to fire the weapon at an elevation of nearly 45° to maximise range. Adverse weather conditions (wind, humidity, rain) during a battle generally limited their striking distance to about 100 m.

Hwachas' range could be extended if the siege weapon was situated on a hill or other elevated place. Singijeon arrows from that position had a range of about 500 yards (≈450 meters).

A 15th-century account from the Annals of Joseon Dynasty tells of an experiment in which the singijeon fired from a hwacha completely pierced a scarecrow armed with a suit of armour and shield, at the range of 80 paces (about 100 m).

Usage 

Hwachas were mostly used in a defensive manner; however, some Western and East Asian historians have concluded that in some cases they were used offensively in sea-to-land attacks and in naval warfare as well, particularly in the Battle of Noryang Point, during the Imjin wars in 1598.

Hwachas were usually carried to battle highly escorted. Once the army settled down in trenches or base camps, the operators would assemble the siege weapon by placing the launching array on the top. Hwachas were similar to European trebuchets to transport, and required assembling before usage. All the pieces featured similar characteristics and the mobile launching array could be unpacked and easily placed on the wood frame on the top of cart.

Once a hwacha was set up for combat, the operators would use the gunpowder stored in a boot-like bag tied on each igniter to be used for each hole on the machine. After that, the operators were able to load the hwacha with arrows or iron spikes and be ready to shoot. To do so, they stepped back, covered their ears, and pulled the rope for each igniter.

At sea, manoeuvres were slightly different and more complex because the operator would need to find a proper and stable place to fire. Some Hwacha operators preferred to be on the rowers' deck where they were able to shoot from the windows, while others preferred to be on the main deck so they could shoot at the sails of the enemy ships. These kind of manoeuvres were particularly seen on Korean Panokseon warships.

See also 

 Huo Che
 Japanese invasions of Korea (1592–1598)
 Battle of Haengju
 Singijeon
 Fire arrow
 Ribauldequin
 Huolongjing
 Katyusha, a multi-barrel Soviet rocket launcher used in World War 2.
 Hwacha on MythBusters
 Type 63 multiple rocket launcher and RPU-14 - modern versions of light MRL

References 

Early firearms
Rocket artillery
Firearms of Korea
Salvo weapons
Weapons of Korea
Early rocketry